Red Queen is a young adult fantasy novel written by American writer Victoria Aveyard. Published in February 2015, it was her first novel and first series. Aveyard followed up with three sequels: Glass Sword, King's Cage and War Storm. Red Queen won the 2015 Goodreads Choice Award for Debut Goodreads Author and was nominated for the 2015 Goodreads Choice Award for Young Adult Fantasy & Science Fiction.

Summary
Mare Barrow is a Red 17-year-old living with her parents and a younger sister, Gisa. Her three older brothers, Bree, Tramy, and Shade, serve in the front line of a war fought between the northern Kingdom the Lakelands and the Barrows' homeland, the Kingdom of Norta. Norta is currently ruled by King Tiberias Calore VI, one of many "Silver" citizens, whose silver blood and supernatural powers allow them to rule over the more numerous yet powerless red blooded population. Mare is jealous of Gisa because her skills in sewing earned her a job working for Silvers, and Reds who have jobs don't have to conscript in the war. When Mare learns that Kilorn Warren, her best friend, will be conscripted, she plans an escape and meets with a colleague who directs her to Farley, a captain of the Scarlet Guard, insurgents composed of Reds who want to bring equality between their people and the Silvers. Farley demands an exorbitant sum of money in exchange for Kilorn's escape.

Mare's plan to steal from a Silver with Gisa goes horribly wrong when live news reports that the Scarlet Guard bombed Silver buildings, inciting Silvers around them to grow violent. Gisa's hand is broken in the chaos, forcing her to quit her job and stop supporting Mare's family, whilst diminishing Gisa's dreams of becoming a seamstress. Unable to bear the guilt she feels towards Gisa and her family, Mare goes to a tavern and began stealing from random people to occupy her thoughts. While there, she gets sloppy and is caught while attempting to steal from a boy. Surprisingly, instead of turning her in he gives her money. He informs her that his name is Cal and he works as a servant at the palace. He walks her home and listens as she informs him of her tragic life. He gives her another coin out of pity and leaves. The next day, Mare is taken to the king's local residence and given a job as a servant. She discovers that Cal is Tiberias Calore VI's son, Prince Tiberias Calore VII, who granted her her work in the palace in order to protect her from conscription. During the Queenstrial, where Silver nobility compete for Cal's hand in marriage, Mare accidentally displays electrokinetic powers against Cal's eventual bride, Evangeline Samos. She is captured, but because the king fears of an uprising should a Red be discovered to have supernatural powers, Mare is made a bride of Tiberias' second son, the shy Maven, given the name Mareena Titanos, and a cover story: the daughter of a Silver general who died on the battle field and was adopted by the Reds in the war zone. Mare feels torn as she realizes she is in love with Cal, her betrothed's brother and the future Silver king. However, she soon grows to develop feelings for Maven instead.

Suddenly having to live as a noble within the king's ranks, Mare slowly acquaints herself with Maven and Cal while also befriending Julian Jacos, Cal's uncle and a librarian who teaches her how to control her powers. Mare is permitted to say goodbye to her family by Cal and learns the return of her brothers Bree and Tramy, but not Shade, who was beheaded by Silver officers for reported desertion. Furious that her favorite brother was killed, Mare joins the Scarlet Guard. While meeting with Farley to discuss plans, Mare is infuriated when she learns that Kilorn joined, and surprised when she sees that Maven joined as well. This new revelation brings Mare and Maven closer together and they become lovers. The plan involves disrupting a royal ball and killing several important Silvers. However, an unexpected and mysterious bomb goes off, killing many innocents in the process, and also resulting in the capture of Kilorn, Farley, and other members of the Scarlet Guard. Though the rebels are able to be freed thanks to Julian's help, Mare is alarmed when she learns that Farley was not responsible for the bomb dropped at the palace. The bomb gave Silvers the ability to paint the Scarlet Guard as dangerous murderers to the public.

Due to the attack of the Scarlet Guard, the Reds are punished by the Silvers with the lowering of the age of conscription from 18 to 15. Mare herself is ordered to broadcast the new law. Julian confesses that his research concludes that Mare's blood has a genetic mutation, allowing for a person with red blood to have Silver-like powers, and be stronger than both; furthermore, she is not the only one with the mutation. Shade also had the mutation, which was why he was executed; the only reason Mare was spared was because her powers manifested while she was viewed by many Silver onlookers, thus preventing a cover-up. Julian also mentions that he needs to go into hiding so he leaves Mare a list of names of people like her. After another meeting with Farley in a free zone that the Silvers have been avoiding, Mare, at Maven's suggestion, infiltrates the king's residence in the capital, Archeon. There, through the underground-roaming Undertrains, the rebels stake an invasion. Mare attempts to convince Cal to allow the Scarlet Guard overtake the castle, and admits to helping them. Cal, stung by her betrayal, refuses and arrests both Mare and Maven, leading them to the castle. However, once in the presence of Queen Elara and King Tiberius, Queen Elara reveals that she and Maven have been manipulating Mare the whole time in a plot to grant Maven the title of King and murder Cal. Maven hints that he and his mother caused the explosion to paint the Scarlet Guard in a bad light. Elara then uses her power of mind control to force Cal to kill his father on live television, thus branding him and Mare traitors and allowing Maven to become king. It is also revealed that Elara murdered the King's first wife many years ago in order to become Queen and gain more power.

Mare and Cal are sentenced to death and put in an arena with their powers stifled. Mare and Cal battle their former sparring partners, including Evangeline, and manage to kill a few Silvers before they retreat. They are rescued by the Scarlet Guard and they escape by the Undertrain before Maven can stop them. Inside it, Mare meets with Farley, Kilorn, and, to her shock, Shade, who faked his death and is also a part of the Scarlet Guard. Mare vows to take revenge against Maven, and use the list she acquired from Julian to seek out others like her.

Characters
 Mare Barrow: The 17-year-old Mare is a Red who steals for a living, but the discovery that she holds supernatural powers causes many to try to vie for her allegiance. She holds tremendous electrokinetic powers, which she uses to either absorb or release lightning. Thus explaining her nickname "The Little Lightning Girl".
 Tiberias "Cal" Calore VII: The elder son and heir of King Tiberias Calore VI through his first wife, Coriane Jacos. Though he is engaged to Evangeline, he is in love with Mare, a fact that she uses to further her goals in the Scarlet Guard. He is a Burner, which means his Silver powers allow him to manipulate fire. He doesn't get along with Mare's best friend Kilorn.
 Maven Calore: King Tiberias VI' second son through his second wife, Elara Merandus, and thus Cal's half-brother. He is shy, but Mare's sudden engagement with him makes him open up. Like Cal and his father, Maven has the ability to control flames. Maven is deeply jealous of Cal, partly because he thought his brother had won Mare's heart, the way he had won their father's. In contrast, Mare had preferred Maven over Cal.
 Diana Farley: A captain of the Scarlet Guard who leads them in the campaigns against the Silvers. She is strongly dedicated to the cause.
 Tiberias Calore VI: The current king of Norta who has married twice, producing two sons: Cal and Maven. He holds the ability to manipulate fire, which he passed to both of his sons.
 Elara Merandus: The mysterious and sadistic current queen of Norta and the mother of Maven. Mare dislikes her since the very start of their meeting. She is able to read and manipulate people with the ability known as Whispering. 
 Julian Jacos: A royal librarian and the brother of Cal's deceased mother, Coriane, making him his uncle. He is the last known person to hold the power of a Singer: being able to control people through his voice.
 Evangeline Samos: A haughty girl who is made Cal's fiancée after being declared the best of the aspiring princesses. She holds a grudge against Mare, particularly after the latter humiliates her by expending her electrokinesis and repelling her magnetic manipulation, a trait of the House Samos.
 Kilorn Warren: Mare's best friend and an apprentice of fishing. Mare seems content to eventually become his wife, until her engagement with Maven makes them drift apart. The attempt to spare him of conscription is the catalyst of much of the novel's plot. He doesn't get along with Cal.
 Lucas Samos: Evangeline's cousin who, like her, holds the power of magnetic manipulation. He is one of the few Silvers whom Mare befriends and trusts with certainty. 
 Rane Arven: The instructor for the Silver Elites who has the ability to negate the powers of other people, known as Silencing. 
 Ptolemus Samos: Evangeline's older brother. Like her, he is a Magnetron, able to manipulate metal.
 Sara Skonos: A friend of Julian who works as a nurse with her ability to heal people, known as Skin Healing. She seems to know the truth behind the death of Cal's mother, Queen Coriane, and Elara thus punished her by mutilating her tongue, making her mute.
 Tristan: Farley's loyal right-hand man in the Scarlet Guard. He is killed by Ptolemus Samos when caught in the attack on the Hall. 
 Ann Walsh: A member of the Scarlet Guard who is about the same age as Mare. She works as a servant in Mare's room in the Hall and tells Mare the time of the midnight meeting with the Scarlet Guard. On the attack of the Hall, she is captured but escapes with Farley and Kilorn. While making sure the way is clear for Mare and the others to come back to the Whitefire Palace, she is captured and commits suicide with a pill before the queen is able to interrogate her. Her last words were "For Tristan".
 Gisa Barrow: Mare's 14-year-old sister who works as an apprentice for a seamstress, until her broken hand terminates her from the job.
 Mare's other family members consist of a war-weary father, a homemaker mother, and three older brothers: the hunky but unperceptive Bree, the sycophantic Tramy, and the lean but smart Shade. Out of the three, Mare is the closest to Shade, who is 19 years old.
 Coriane Jacos: The late wife of Tiberias Calore VI and sister to Julian Jacos. Coriane was known as the "Singer Queen" because the Jacos house were Singers. Queen Elara did not like Coraine becoming queen so Elara murdered Coriane and took the crown, killing Tiberias at the end of the book.

Reception
Red Queen has been generally well received. The Guardian gave the novel four stars. Vilma Gonzalez of USA Today described the novel positively, revealing that "Aveyard’s compelling debut is richly imagined, addictive, chilling and suspenseful. She breathes new life into her own unique Game of Thrones story enlivened by exciting, character-driven plot twists that have me clamoring for more. This scintillating tale of betrayals and blood-spattered crowns is not to be missed."

However, Grand Forks Herald'''s Cassidy Anderson stated "Ultimately, this book was over-hyped. It's still a fun read as long as you are not looking for anything with a lot of depth or meaning to it." The Christian Science Monitor described the book as a dystopian novel.Kirkus Reviews saw "An inventive, character-driven twist breathes new life into tired fantasy trends."Publishers Weekly found "There’s an unmistakable feeling of deja vu to this first installment in the Red Queen trilogy, which shares several plot points and similarities with the Hunger Games series, ... Fortunately, Aveyard’s conclusion leaves the story poised to depart from this derivative setup."

Common Sense Media wrote "With its courageous protagonist, action-packed plot, and romantic possibilities, Red Queen is a winning series start for fantasy and dystopia lovers."

 Adaptations 
Gennifer Hutchison, a writer and producer on Better Call Saul and Breaking Bad, was hired in 2015 by Universal Pictures to adapt the novel into a feature film. Pitch Perfect 2'' director Elizabeth Banks was in talks with the studio to direct and produce the project.

In May 2021, it was reported that Peacock is in developing a television series adaptation of novel. Banks is set to direct and also set to star in a supporting role.

References

External links
 ‘Hunger Games’ Meets ‘X-Men': Check Out ‘Red Queen’ by MTV

English-language novels
Dystopian novels
2015 American novels
Young adult fantasy novels
American fantasy novels
American young adult novels
HarperCollins books
Fantasy novel series